Mantharan Cheral Irumporai (Tamil: மாந்தரன் சேரல் இரும்பொறை) was a ruler of the Chera dynasty in early historic south India (c. 1st - 4th century CE).

Biography 
He was a warring ruler, and constantly moved about the frontiers of his dominions. He was hailed "Yanai Katchai" meaning 'the One with an Eye-sight Like an Elephant'.

According to early Tamil literature, Mantharan Cheral was a contemporary of famous Pandya ruler Nedum Chezhian (II, early 3rd century CE). Purananuru tells that he participated in the battle of Talaiyalam-Kanam allied with Chola ruler Killivalavan and five other small rulers including Ezhini, Thithiyan, Irungo Vaenman, Porunan and Erumaiyuran against Nedum Chezhian. However, the Pandyas invaded the Chera country, won the battle and Mantharan Cheral was taken as a prisoner to Madurai. After his court trial at Madurai he was locked in a fort "inside a bamboo forest surrounded by the crocodile lake". Mantharan Cheral later escaped from his cell and returned to his country and "continued to rule his loving people in peace, plenty and harmony for many more uninterrupted years".

The Chola ruler  was also at war with Mantharan Cheral, and Thervan Malayan chief of Miladu is said to have assisted the Cholas in these battles. Kurunkozhiyur Kizhar, a poet in the Mantharan Cheral's court, praises the king for having once saved a city called Vilamkil from the enemies.

Death 
The poet Kurunkozhiyur Kizhar and Kudalur Kizhar who were present at the death of Mandaran Cheral state that the death was portended by a falling star (possibly a comet) seven days previous to the occurrence.

The mentioned brightly visualised comet that appeared in the said month of March and April might have been the Halley's comet of February–April 141 CE  under the Aries across Phalguna.

References

Ancient Indian monarchs
Tamil monarchs
People of the Chera kingdom
History of Tamil Nadu
Chera kings

de:Chola
ja:チョーラ朝
ta:சோழர்